Rubus invisus is a species of dewberry, known as upland dewberry. Like other dewberries, it is a species of flowering plant in the rose family, related to the blackberry. It is found in the eastern and east-central United States.

Description
Rubus invisus is a trailing shrub with stems running along the surface of the ground. Leaves are large and very coarsely toothed. Flowers and fruit form on unusually long stems.

Distribution and habitat
Rubus invisus has been found in Indiana, Kentucky, Maryland, Massachusetts, Missouri, New Hampshire, New York, Ohio, Pennsylvania, Tennessee, Vermont, Virginia, West Virginia.  It typically inhabits areas of rocky soil and partial to full shade.

References

External links
 

invisus
Flora of the United States
Plants described in 1891